Round Valley High School is a high school serving 445 students in Eagar, Arizona, United States. It is the only high school in the Round Valley Unified School District.

When Blue School District in Blue was a K-8 school, Round Valley served Blue for high school, with some students living with relatives in Eagar and some traveling to and from Eagar via school bus.

History
For several years until 1961, when enrollment was 180, the number of students kept increasing. In 1962 that figure was down to 170 (which was up from 168 two weeks prior to the start of that school year).

On 11 June 2010, a small plane crashed into the high school administration building, killing a family of four on board. It might have been trying to land on the practice football field in high winds.

Dome

The school owns the Round Valley Ensphere, a multi-use domed stadium that hosts football, basketball, and other sports events, plus non-school functions such as car shows.

Notable alumni
 Mark Gastineau, former defensive end for the New York Jets (1979–88)

References

External links
 

Public high schools in Arizona
Schools in Apache County, Arizona
Education in Greenlee County, Arizona